ABC Portland can refer to:

KATU, the ABC television affiliate in Portland, Oregon
WMTW (TV), the ABC television affiliate in Portland, Maine